The 1999 Eastern District Council election was held on 28 November 1999 to elect all 37 elected members to the 46-member District Council.

Overall election results
Before election:

Change in composition:

References

1999 Hong Kong local elections